Shane Gillis (born December 11, 1987) is an American stand-up comedian, radio personality, sketch comedy writer, and podcaster. He is co-host of Matt and Shane's Secret Podcast with fellow stand-up comedian Matt McCusker. In 2019, Gillis was named one of Just for Laughs' "New Faces" at their yearly comedy festival in Montreal.

Gillis was announced as a new cast member on the NBC sketch comedy series Saturday Night Live in 2019, only to be fired from the show four days later, due to backlash from clips of a 2018 episode of a podcast featuring jokes that contained racial slurs. In 2021, Gillis released his first comedy special, Shane Gillis: Live in Austin on YouTube. Gillis is also known for his collaborations with filmmaker John McKeever, on their online sketch series Gilly & Keeves.

Early life
Shane Gillis is a native of Mechanicsburg, Pennsylvania, a town located just outside Harrisburg. While attending Trinity High School in nearby Camp Hill, he was on its football team as an offensive tackle. He graduated in 2006. He went to West Point on a football scholarship, but quit shortly into his first year. He subsequently attended and played a year of football at Elon University and eventually graduated from West Chester University. After graduating, he spent six months teaching English in Spain.

Career

Early career (2012–2019) 
Gillis began performing comedy in 2012. He regularly performed in Harrisburg, Pennsylvania. To further his career, he relocated to Philadelphia. In 2015, he placed third at Helium Comedy Club's annual "Philly's Phunniest" tournament, and he won the tournament the next year. Shane has named among his biggest stand-up influences Louis C.K., Norm Macdonald, Dave Chappelle, Patrice O'Neal, Bernie Mac, and Bill Burr.

In 2016, Gillis began Matt and Shane's Secret Podcast with Matt McCusker. In 2017, Gillis became a frequent guest on The Bonfire with Big Jay Oakerson and Dan Soder, increasing his popularity. He also began a weekly show on Compound Media called A Fair One with Tommy Pope.

In 2019, Comedy Central named Gillis an "Up Next" comedian as he performed at Comedy Central's Clusterfest. That same year, Gillis was recognized as a "New Face" at the Just for Laughs comedy festival in Montreal. During an interview for All Things Considered at that festival, Gillis was interrupted by stand-up comedian Robert Kelly, who said, "You're very funny, dude ... I mean, I wanted to hate it." The interviewer, Andrew Limbong, described Gillis' set at the festival, writing: "Shane Gillis gives off post-jock energy—like someone who used to play a sport in school, then had the self-awareness to realize he wasn't cut out for it and stopped—but he isn't bitter about it at all. His friendly demeanor distracts you, while he sneaks in just a whiff of social insight within a barrage of self-deprecating sex jokes."

Saturday Night Live (2019) 
Gillis's addition to Saturday Night Live as a featured cast member was announced on September 12, 2019, along with Bowen Yang and Chloe Fineman.

Later that day, however, several clips of a 2018 episode of Matt and Shane's Secret Podcast, which have since been removed from YouTube, resurfaced, in which Gillis made jokes that included the word "chink", an ethnic slur for Chinese people. In other clips, Gillis and co-host Matt McCusker ranked comedians by race, gender, and sexual orientation, which included the use of gay slurs. Later that night, Gillis posted a tweet saying that "I'm a comedian who pushes boundaries" and that "if you go through my 10 years of comedy, most of it bad, you're going to find a lot of bad misses. I'm happy to apologize to anyone who's actually offended by anything I've said." Four days later, a spokesperson for Lorne Michaels, the creator of the show, announced that Gillis had been removed from the cast.

Afterwards, Gillis maintained that while the clips looked bad, they were taken out of context and he was misquoted in the majority of articles reporting the story. Gillis also stated that he immediately regretted using the "I'm a comedian who pushes boundaries" statement, blaming it on having "literally 5 minutes of being pressured to write anything", acknowledging the statement was "corny" and that he officially retracted the statement.

Continuation of stand-up, sketch and comedy special (2020–present) 
In January 2020, Gillis was named "2019's Stand-Up Comedian of the Year" in Theinterrobang's Sixth Annual Comedy Awards.

In December 2020, Shane and comedian John McKeever launched the web series Gilly and Keeves, featuring comedy sketches starring Gillis and McKeever such as "ISIS Toyota", "Uncle Daycare", and "Trump Speed Dating".

On September 7, 2021, Gillis released his first live comedy special, Shane Gillis: Live in Austin on YouTube. Comedy website The Laugh Button ranked Shane's special in second place in their top 20 comedy specials of 2021.

Since 2021, Gillis along with comics Mark Normand and Ari Shaffir, have made a series of appearances on The Joe Rogan Experience, known as the "Protect Our Parks" episodes. In 2021 and 2022, Shane had been invited to open for comedians Louis C.K. and Chris Rock on their recent stand-up tours.

In media
Gillis frequently appears on the Faction Talk show The Bonfire with Big Jay Oakerson and Dan Soder on Sirius XM, The Doug Stanhope Podcast on the GaS Digital Network, comedy podcasts Legion of Skanks and The Real Ass Podcast. He has also appeared in the comedy podcast The Adam Friedland Show. He was profiled in The New Yorker on September 19, 2022.

References

External links
 
 

1987 births
21st-century American male actors
21st-century American comedians
21st-century American male writers
American male comedians
American people of Irish descent
American sketch comedians
American stand-up comedians
American podcasters
Race-related controversies in stand-up comedy
Race-related controversies in television
LGBT-related controversies in television
Comedians from Pennsylvania
Living people
Male actors from Philadelphia
People from Mechanicsburg, Pennsylvania
Writers from Philadelphia
West Chester University alumni
Patreon creators